New Town is the first album by Koop Arponen, the winner of the 2008 Finnish Idols competition.

Track listing
 Every Song I Hear – 03:56
 Everything I’m Not – 04:05
 Sweet Words And A Lonely Night Away – 03:33
 Innocent Eyes – 3:53
 Love Is Cool (feat. Anna Puu) – 03:40
 You're The Reason – 04:05
 Broadway Sky – 03:50
 Loosing You  – 02:56
 I Don’t Regret Anything – 03:32
 Voices Of The Past – 04:21
 Insomnia – 03:33

Charts

References

2009 albums